The 1884 Prohibition National Convention was a presidential nominating convention held at Lafayette Hall, in Pittsburgh, Pennsylvania from July 23–24, 1884, to select the Prohibition Party's presidential ticket for the 1884 presidential election.

Opening

On July 23, 1884, the convention was called to open by Chairman Gideon T. Stewart and was attended by 505 delegates from thirty one states. Reverend Alonzo Ames Miner, who had served as the president of the 1880 convention, gave the opening prayer, Secretary R. W. Nelson read the call for the convention, Stewart gave the opening address where he criticized the alcohol industry as a greater evil than slavery, Reverend C. W. Blanchard gave a speech, and Frances Willard read a message from the Woman's Christian Temperance Union giving support to a constitutional amendment prohibiting the sale and consumption of alcohol. 

Samuel Dickie was selected to serve as the chairman of the convention and afterwards the vice-presidents of the thirty one state delegations were selected with ten being female.

Presidential nomination

On July 24, the delegates reconvened to vote on the presidential nomination. The California delegation nominated R. H. McDonald, who was seconded by delegates from Kentucky and Maine, the Illinois delegation nominated former Kansas Governor John St. John, who was seconded by Frances Willard, the Massachusetts delegation nominated Gideon T. Stewart, and a delegate from Pennsylvania nominated former presidential nominee James Black. Stewart withdrew from the balloting and endorsed St. John, the California delegation withdrew McDonald's nomination, and Black declined to contest the presidential ballot.

John B. Finch made a motion to suspend the rules to nominate St. John by acclamation was successful and 505 delegates voted in favor of St. John, who accepted the nomination via telegram. William Daniel of Maryland was selected to serve as the vice-presidential nominee.

Platform

The platform drafted by the platform committee was approved by the delegates, and it criticized the Republican and Democratic parties for not creating prohibition legislation while in power, included support for the prohibition of the sale and consumption of alcohol, increasing immigration, political and civil gender equality, women's suffrage, refusing to allow statehood to areas without the prohibition of polygamous marriages, soldier pensions, and money issued and regulated by the federal government. 

The platform plank in support of women's suffrage was weakened by Frances Willard to gain support among southern votes.

See also
1884 Republican National Convention
1884 Democratic National Convention

References

Prohibition Party
1884 conferences
1884 United States presidential election